National Union for Democracy and Development (in French: Union Nationale pour la Démocratie et le Développement) was a political party in Upper Volta. The UNDD is led by Hermann Yaméogo, the son of former president Maurice Yaméogo.

In the 1978 presidential elections UNDD launched Macaire Ouédraogo as its candidate. Ouédraogo got around 250,000 votes in the first round (2nd place) and 552,956 votes (43.8%) in the second. In the parliamentary elections held same year UNDD came second.
In 2005 the party, refounded took part in the presidential election of 13 November, where its candidate Hermann Yaméogo won 0.76% of the popular vote.

Defunct political parties in Burkina Faso